No. 42 (Expeditionary Support) Wing RAF is a wing of the Royal Air Force A4 Force based at RAF Wittering. It provides high readiness, specialist engineering support for air operations around the world.

42 (ES) Wing was formed in November 2007 to provide a command structure for the Royal Air Force's engineering Air Combat Service Support Units (ACSSUs).  Its name and badge are taken from that of No. 42 Group, which was responsible for Royal Air Force bomb and fuel storage during World War II. The Wing motto 'Fulmen Alatum Tenemus' translates as 'We hold in readiness the winged thunderbolts'.

Structure
The wing consists of:
 No. 71 Inspection and Repair (IR) Squadron
 No. 93 Expeditionary Armaments (EA) Squadron
 No. 5001 Squadron
Joint Aircraft Recovery and Transportation Squadron

References

External links
 

Expeditionary Support 042
42
Military units and formations of the United Kingdom in the War in Afghanistan (2001–2021)
Military units and formations established in 2007
2007 establishments in the United Kingdom